Philip Michael Handford (born 18 July 1964) is an English former professional footballer. He began his career with Gillingham, and his later clubs included Wimbledon, Crewe Alexandra and Maidstone United.

In the summer 1985, he played in Finland for Koparit.

References

1964 births
Living people
Sportspeople from Chatham, Kent
Footballers from Kent
English footballers
Gillingham F.C. players
Wimbledon F.C. players
Crewe Alexandra F.C. players
Maidstone United F.C. (1897) players
Welling United F.C. players
Sittingbourne F.C. players
Erith & Belvedere F.C. players
Margate F.C. players
English Football League players
National League (English football) players
Association football midfielders